The 2017–18 Brown Bears women's basketball team represents Brown University during the 2017–18 NCAA Division I women's basketball season. The Bears, led by fourth year head coach Sarah Behn, play their home games at the Pizzitola Sports Center and were members of the Ivy League. They finished the season 15–12, 3–11 in Ivy League play to finish in a tie for sixth place. They failed to qualify for the Ivy women's tournament.

Previous season
They finished the season 17–13, 7–7 in Ivy League play to finish in a tie for fourth place. They lost in the semifinals of the Ivy women's tournament to Penn. They were invited to the Women's Basketball Invitational where defeated UMBC in the first round before losing in the quarterfinals to UNC Greensboro.

Roster

Schedule

|-
!colspan=9 style=| Non-conference regular season

|-
!colspan=9 style=| Ivy League regular season

See also
 2017–18 Brown Bears men's basketball team

References

Brown Bears women's basketball seasons
Brown
Brown
Brown